"Everybody's Lonely" is the lead single from Jukebox the Ghost's fifth studio album, Off to the Races. The single was self-released on January 18, 2018.

Commercially, the track is the band's most successful single to date, being their first song to chart. The single reached number 22 on the Billboard Alternative Songs chart and number 26 on the Rock Airplay chart.

Charts

References 

2018 singles
2018 songs
Jukebox the Ghost songs